Big Smoke Burger is an international restaurant chain based in Canada.

History
The Big Smoke Burger was founded by Mustafa Yusuf in November 2007, originally under the name Craft Burger. It rebranded to Big Smoke Burger in 2011 after Yusuf was unable to secure a trademark for the original name. The new name was chosen as "Big Smoke" has been a noted nickname for the city of Toronto, which is where the company has its headquarters.

In 2013, the company began to expand its reach into the Middle East and the United States. As of October 2017, 19 locations were in operation worldwide.

In June 2013, Big Smoke Burger opened their first location in the United States in Glendale, Colorado. A second location was opened in New York City in July 2014. The sale of burgers and poutine never caught on south of the St. Lawrence River and both locations were quietly closed by 2017 and the company has since left the United States.

MTY
In September 2015, MTY Food Group paid $3 million to acquire 60% of Big Smoke Burger.  Big Smoke founder and president Mustafa Yusuf retained the remaining 40% of the company.

At the time of the acquisition, Big Smoke Burger had a total of 17 locations. Of the 17 locations, 9 were located in Canada, 4 of which were corporately-owned. The remaining 8 locations were in the United States and the Middle East.

After the sale, Yusuf remained with the company as Senior Vice President of Big Smoke Burger.

See also
List of Canadian restaurant chains
 List of hamburger restaurants

References

Further reading
 The Globe and Mail
 The Canadian Business Journal
 Village Voice
 Gulf News
 QSR Magazine

External links
 

Restaurant chains in Canada
Restaurants established in 2007
Restaurants in Toronto
Companies based in Toronto
Hamburger restaurants
Fast-food chains of Canada
2007 establishments in Ontario